Fesca is a surname. Notable people with the surname include:

 Alexander Fesca (1820−1849), German composer and pianist
 Friedrich Ernst Fesca (1789−1826), German violinist and composer 
 Max Fesca (1846−1917), German specialist in agricultural science and agronomy

See also 
 the Marconi-San Girolamo-Fesca
 Fédération du scoutisme centrafricain (FESCA)